Anthony James Fiore (born October 12, 1971) is an American former right-handed Major League Baseball pitcher. In his career, he pitched for the Tampa Bay Devil Rays (-) and the Minnesota Twins (2001-). His signature pitch was the palmball.

His career totals are 87 appearances, 152 innings pitched, a 12–6 win–loss record and an ERA of 4.39. In , he pitched in the ALDS for the Twins. In , he played for the Long Island Ducks in the independent Atlantic League.

External links

Pelota Binaria (Venezuelan Winter League)

1971 births
Living people
Águilas del Zulia players
American people of Italian descent
American expatriate baseball players in Canada
American expatriate baseball players in Taiwan
Baseball players from Illinois
Batavia Clippers players
Caribes de Anzoátegui players
Clearwater Phillies players
Durham Bulls players
Edmonton Trappers players
La New Bears players
Long Island Ducks players
Major League Baseball pitchers
Martinsville Phillies players
Minnesota Twins players
Navegantes del Magallanes players
American expatriate baseball players in Venezuela
New Orleans Zephyrs players
Ottawa Lynx players
Reading Phillies players
Rimini Baseball Club players
Rochester Red Wings players
Salt Lake Buzz players
Scranton/Wilkes-Barre Red Barons players
Spartanburg Phillies players
Sportspeople from Oak Park, Illinois
Tampa Bay Devil Rays players
Toledo Mud Hens players
Triton Trojans baseball players
2006 World Baseball Classic players